The bluestripe ribbon snake (Thamnophis sauritus nitae), which belongs in the same family as the garter snakes, is a subspecies of the ribbon snake that occurs along the Gulf Coast in Florida. Adults are thin and are black with a mid-dorsal stripe that is a lighter shade of black and two blue stripes, hence the name "bluestripe ribbon snake". They are semi-aquatic and are active during the day. They can be found by lakes, rivers, and slow-moving streams.

Diet
They eat frogs, salamanders, small fishes, earthworms, minnows, lizards, and insects.

Size
In adulthood they grow to be . They start out at  after hatching.

References
 Thamnophis sauritus nitae - Florida Museum of Natural History

Thamnophis
Taxa named by Douglas A. Rossman